Carlheinz Neumann (27 November 1905 – 19 May 1983) was a German rower who competed in the 1932 Summer Olympics.

In 1932 he won the gold medal as coxswain of the German boat in the coxed four competition.

External links 
 profile

1905 births
1983 deaths
Coxswains (rowing)
Olympic rowers of Germany
Rowers at the 1932 Summer Olympics
Olympic gold medalists for Germany
Olympic medalists in rowing
German male rowers
Medalists at the 1932 Summer Olympics